Afrinat International Airlines was an airline headquartered in Bakau, the Gambia. It was founded in 2002, and provided scheduled services within West Africa out of Banjul International Airport. In 2004, the airline ceased to exist.

History 
Afrinat International Airlines was created in 2002 by West African businessmen looking to fill the gap left by the disparition of Air Afrique by directly connecting New York's JFK Airport to West African cities. Its first president was Samule Ofori. Afrinat was originally based in the USA.

Afrinat started with 2 aircraft: 1 Boeing 747 (411 passengers, 32 in business) and 1 Boeing 767 (250 passengers, 32 in business).

In April 2003, Afrinat started daily flights connecting New York and Banjul, and serving as a regional hub to West African countries (Ghana, Guinea, Mali, Ivory Coast, Sierra Leone, and Cameroon).

Fleet 
The Afrinat International Airlines fleet consisted of a single McDonnell Douglas DC-9-30 jet aircraft.

Destinations
As of 2004, Afrinat served the following destinations:
The Gambia
Banjul (Banjul International Airport)
Ghana
Accra (Kotoka International Airport)
Guinea
Conakry (Conakry International Airport)
Mali
Bamako (Senou International Airport)
Senegal
Dakar (Dakar-Yoff-Léopold Sédar Senghor International Airport)
Sierra Leone
Freetown (Lungi International Airport)

See also		
 List of defunct airlines of the Gambia
 Transport in the Gambia

References

External links
  via Wayback Machine

Bakau
Defunct airlines of the Gambia
Airlines established in 2002
Airlines disestablished in 2004
2002 establishments in the Gambia
2004 disestablishments in Africa